Natpu is a 1986 Indian Tamil-language film, directed by  Ameerjan and written by Vairamuthu. The film stars Karthik, Sripriya, Radha Ravi and Senthil. It was released on 11 April 1986, and won two Cinema Express Awards.

Plot

Cast 
Karthik
Sripriya
Radha Ravi
Senthil
Ganthimathi
Charle
T. S. Raghavendra

Soundtrack 
Soundtrack was composed by Ilaiyaraaja and lyrics were written by Vairamuthu.

Accolades 
At the 7th Cinema Express Awards, Senthil won the award for Best Comedy Actor, and Radha Ravi received a "special award".

References

External links 
 

1980s Tamil-language films
1986 films
Films directed by Ameerjan
Films scored by Ilaiyaraaja